Petar is a South Slavic masculine given name, their variant of the Biblical name Petros cognate to Peter.

Derivative forms include Pero, Pejo, Pera, Perica, Petrica, Periša. Feminine equivalent is Petra.

People mononymously known as Petar include:

 Petar of Serbia ( – 917), early Prince of the Serbs
 Petar of Duklja, early archont in Dioclea
 Petar Krešimir (died 1074/1075), King of Croatia and Dalmatia
 
 

Notable people with the name are numerous:

See also
 Sveti Petar (disambiguation)
 Petrić
 Petričević

References

Serbian masculine given names
Bulgarian masculine given names
Croatian masculine given names